Bishunpur is a village and postal address in Shahganj, Jaunpur district in the state of Uttar Pradesh, India. The inhabitants of the village follow Lord Vishnu in whose honor the village name was kept Bishunpur in ancient days. This village has an internal relationship with the village Ramapur from ancient days.

References

Villages in Jaunpur district